The Fujifilm FinePix S5200, (known in Europe as S5600), is a bridge digital camera made by Fujifilm. The camera's original MSRP was USD $285.

The camera was introduced by Fuji on July 28, 2005. It was awarded the title of best zoom camera for 2006/2007 by the EISA.

The Fujifilm S5200 was primarily targeted at the power-user photographers in Australia, Europe and the United States. It was superseded by the S5700.

The camera's features were fairly impressive at launch including a 10x optical zoom, a 5.1-megapixel CCD imaging sensor as well as a host of manual settings.

The manual settings which the s5200 featured allow much control over the image, such settings like TTL metering, ISO, flash, Macro, White Balance and Red Eye Reduction could be manipulated.

Features
 Fujinon 10x optical zoom lens, F3.2-F3.5, 38-380 mm
 Focal length f=6.3 mm-63 mm, equivalent to 35 mm film's 38 mm-380 mm
 Aperture F3.2 to F8, 9 steps, 1/3 EV steps
 Shutter lag of 0.015 of a second with pre-set focus
 Video recording (VGA or QVGA)
 Continuous AF and electronic manual focusing
 2 frames per second for up to 3 shots
 AF assist lamp
 Fujichrome film simulation

References

FujiFilm USA Official S5200 Specification Chart

Cameras introduced in 2005
S5200
Bridge digital cameras